The Columbia Gorge Discovery Center & Museum is the official interpretive center and history museum about the Columbia River Gorge located on  in The Dalles, Oregon. Opened in 1997, the  Center features exhibits about the area's geology, Ice Age prehistory, Native American culture and basketry, exploration by Lewis and Clark and others on the Oregon Trail, settlement, transportation and natural history. The Wasco County Historical Museum is a 17,200 square-foot exhibit wing which tells the history of the people of Wasco County, Oregon.

The center also offers live raptor programs, a research library, meeting rooms, auditorium, gift shop and cafe. The site includes a handicap accessible paved interpretive trail with vistas of the Columbia River Gorge and the Klickitat Hills.

See also
National Historic Trails Interpretive Center
National Historic Oregon Trail Interpretive Center

References

External links

 Columbia Gorge Discovery Center & Museum - official site

Buildings and structures in The Dalles, Oregon
Museums in Wasco County, Oregon
History museums in Oregon
Natural history museums in Oregon
1997 establishments in Oregon
Columbia River Gorge
Protected areas of Wasco County, Oregon
Museums established in 1997
Nature centers in Oregon